Amazon Women on the Moon is a 1987 American satirical science fiction film that parodies the experience of watching low-budget films on late-night television. The film, featuring a large ensemble cast including cameo appearances from film and TV stars and even non-actors, was written by Michael Barrie and Jim Mulholland, and takes the form of a compilation of 21 comedy skits directed by five different directors: Joe Dante, Carl Gottlieb, Peter Horton, John Landis, and Robert K. Weiss.

The title Amazon Women on the Moon refers to the central film-within-a-film, a spoof of science-fiction films from the 1950s that borrows heavily from Queen of Outer Space (1958) starring Zsa Zsa Gabor, itself a film that recycles elements of earlier science-fiction works such as Cat-Women of the Moon (1953), Fire Maidens from Outer Space (1955), and Forbidden Planet (1956).

John Landis had previously directed The Kentucky Fried Movie (1977), which employed a similar sketch anthology format.

Plot
Fictional television station WIDB-TV (channel 8) experiences problems with its late-night airing of science-fiction classic Amazon Women on the Moon, a 1950s B movie in which Queen Lara (Sybil Danning) and Captain Nelson (Steve Forrest) battle exploding volcanoes and man-eating spiders on the Moon. Waiting for the film to resume, an unseen viewer begins channel surfing—simulated by bursts of white noise—through late night cable, with the various segments and sketches of the film representing the programming found on different channels. The viewer intermittently returns to channel 8, where Amazon Women continues airing before faltering once more.

These segments feature:
 Arsenio Hall as a man who experiences a series of mishaps around his apartment;
 Monique Gabrielle as a model who goes about her daily routine in Laguna, California, completely naked;
 Lou Jacobi as a man named Murray, zapped into the television, wandering throughout sketches looking for his wife;
 Michelle Pfeiffer and Peter Horton as a young couple having trouble with eccentric doctor Griffin Dunne delivering and then concealing their newborn baby;
 Joe Pantoliano as the presenter of a commercial recommending stapling carpet to a bald head as a hair loss prevention measure;
 David Alan Grier and B.B. King in a public-service appeal for "blacks without soul" featuring "Don 'No Soul' Simmons";
 Rosanna Arquette as a young woman on a blind date, employing unusual methods of investigation to reveal the qualifications of Steve Guttenberg;
 Henry Silva as the host of a show entitled Bullshit or Not?, clearly intended as a spoof of Ripley's Believe It or Not! with Jack Palance and In Search of...;
 Archie Hahn as a man who dies after being mauled (by Roger Barkley and Al Lohman, mimicking Gene Siskel and Roger Ebert), then is roasted at his funeral by a variety of people, including Steve Allen, Henny Youngman, and even his own wife;
 William Marshall as the leader of the Video Pirates, who hijack an MCA Home Video ship, uncover a vast amount of videotapes and laserdiscs, and promptly begin illegally bootlegging the media;
 Ed Begley Jr., as the son of the Invisible Man, having trouble with his formula;
 Angel Tompkins as a president's First Lady who is also a former hooker;
 Matt Adler as a sexually frustrated teenager trying to purchase a pack of condoms, with unexpected results;
 Marc McClure renting a personalized date video that spills over into real life;
 "Reckless Youth" – an epilogue at the end of the credits, with Carrie Fisher and Paul Bartel in a black-and-white ephemeral film warning about the spread of "social diseases" in the style of Reefer Madness.

Alternative versions
An alternate version of the "Pethouse Video" sketch was filmed for the television broadcast of the film, with Monique Gabrielle in lingerie instead of appearing naked throughout the segment. However, most European television broadcasts of the film retained the original theatrical version. Bullshit or Not? was retitled Baloney or Not? for the television version.

The American television edit, in addition to the alternative "Pethouse Video" sketch, features an additional bridging sequence between the death of Harvey Pitnik and his subsequent celebrity roast. In it, the mortician successfully cons Pitnik's widow into having the celebrity roast as part of the funeral, and her performance gets such strong positive feedback, it becomes a continuing performance series lasting for weeks.

The DVD release features an unreleased sketch titled "The Unknown Soldier", starring Robert Loggia with Ronny Cox, Bernie Casey, and Wallace Langham. Some television broadcasts of the film featured the sketches "Peter Pan Theater" and "The French Ventriloquist's Dummy", which were not present in the theatrical version.

Cast
"Mondo Condo" (directed by John Landis):
 Arsenio Hall as Apartment Victim
"Pethouse Video" (directed by Carl Gottlieb):
 Donald F. Muhich as Easterbrook
 Monique Gabrielle as Taryn Steele
"Murray in Videoland" (directed by Robert K. Weiss):
 Lou Jacobi as Murray
 Erica Yohn as Selma
 Debby Davison as Weatherperson
 Rob Krausz as Floor Manager
 Phil Hartman as Baseball Announcer
 Corey Burton as Anchorman
"Hospital" (directed by Landis):
 Michelle Pfeiffer as Brenda Landers
 Peter Horton as Harry Landers
 Griffin Dunne as Dr. Raymond
 Brian Ann Zoccola as Nurse
"Hairlooming" (directed by Joe Dante):
 Joe Pantoliano as Sy Swerdlow
 Stanley Brock as Customer
"Amazon Women on the Moon" (directed by Weiss):
 Corey Burton as TV Announcer
 Steve Forrest as Captain Steve Nelson
 Robert Colbert as "Blackie"
 Joey Travolta as Butch
 Forrest J Ackerman as U.S. President
 Sybil Danning as Queen Lara
 Lana Clarkson as Alpha Beta
 Lyle Talbot as Prescott Townsend
"Blacks Without Soul" (directed by Landis):
 David Alan Grier as Don 'No Soul' Simmons
 B.B. King as himself
 William Bryant (credited as Bill Bryant) as Male Republican
 Roxie Roker as Female Republican
 Le Tari as Pimp
 Christopher Broughton as Fan Club President
"Two I.D.s" (directed by Peter Horton):
 Rosanna Arquette as Karen
 Steve Guttenberg as Jerry
"Bullshit or Not" (directed by Dante):
 Henry Silva as himself
 Sarah Lilly as Prostitute
"Critics' Corner" (directed by Dante):
 Roger Barkley (credited as Barkley) as Herbert
 Al Lohman (credited as Lohman) as Frankel
 Archie Hahn as Harvey Pitnik
 Belinda Balaski as Bernice Pitnik
 Justin Benham as Pitnik Boy
 Erica Gayle as Pitnik Girl
"Silly Pâté" (directed by Weiss):
 Corey Burton as Announcer
 T. K. Carter as Host
 Phil Proctor as Mike
 Ira Newborn as Fred
 Karen Montgomery as Karen
"Roast Your Loved One" (directed by Dante):
 Archie Hahn as Harvey Pitnik
 Belinda Balaski as Bernice Pitnik
 Justin Benham as Pitnik Boy
 Erica Gayle as Pitnik Girl
 Bryan Cranston as Paramedic #1
 Robert Picardo as Rick Raddnitz
 Rip Taylor as himself
 Slappy White as himself
 Jackie Vernon as himself
 Henny Youngman as himself
 Charlie Callas as himself
 Steve Allen as himself
"Video Pirates" (directed by Weiss):
 William Marshall as Pirate Captain
 Tino Insana as Mr. Sylvio
 Donald Gibb as Graceless Pirate
 Frank Collison as Grizzled Pirate
 Bill Taylor as Gruesome Pirate
"Son of the Invisible Man" (directed by Gottlieb):
 Ed Begley Jr. as Griffin
 Chuck Lafont as Trent
 Pamla Vale as Woman In Pub
 Larry Hankin as man In Pub
 Garry Goodrow as Checker Player
 Roger La Page as London Bobby
"French Ventriloquist's Dummy" (directed by Dante):
 Dick Miller as Danny Clayton the Ventriloquist
 Phil Bruns as Danny's Manager
 Martin Goslins as the French Ventriloquist
"Art Sale" (directed by Gottlieb):
 John Ingle as Felix Van Dam
"First Lady of the Evening" (directed by Weiss):
 Angel Tompkins as First Lady
 Terry McGovern as Salesman
 Michael Hanks as Announcer
"Titan Man" (directed by Weiss):
 Matt Adler as George
 Kelly Preston as Violet
 Ralph Bellamy as Mr. Gower
 Howard Hesseman as Rupert King
 Steve Cropper as Customer
 Chris Wolf as Mascot Bip
"Video Date" (directed by Landis):
 Marc McClure as Ray
 Russ Meyer as Video Salesman
 Corrine Wahl as Sharri
 Andrew Dice Clay as Frankie
 Willard E. Pugh as Speaking Cop
"Reckless Youth" (directed by Dante):
 Carrie Fisher as Mary Brown
 Paul Bartel as Doctor
 Herb Vigran as Agent
 Tracy Hutchinson as Floozie
 Mike Mazurki as Dutch
 Frank Beddor as Ken
"The Unknown Soldier" (directed by Horton)
 Robert Loggia as General McCormick
 Bernie Casey as Major General Hadley
 Ronny Cox as General Balentine
 Wallace Langham as Private Anson W. Pucket
"Peter Pan Theatre" (directed by Gottlieb)
 Jenny Agutter as Cleopatra
 Raye Birk as Vanya
 Mark Bringelson as Theater Customer #1
 Victoria Ann Lewis as Theater Customer #2
 Vivian Bonnell as Theater Customer #3
 Kellye Nakahara as Theater Customer #4

Reception
The majority of critics agreed that the quality was inconsistent throughout the film. Variety called it "irreverent, vulgar and silly... [with] some hilarious moments and some real groaners too." Roger Ebert in the Chicago Sun-Times felt that the exercise was somewhat unnecessary: "Satirists are in trouble when their subjects are funnier than they are."

Janet Maslin of The New York Times, in a largely positive review, described the film as "an anarchic, often hilarious adventure in dial-spinning, a collection of brief skits and wacko parodies that are sometimes quite clever, though they're just as often happily sophomoric, too."

Certain portions of the film were singled out for praise. "The funniest episode probably is 'Son of the Invisible Man', directed by Carl Gottlieb, in which Ed Begley Jr. plays a man who thinks he is invisible but is not", wrote the Chicago Sun-Times. "The film's best sight gags come from Robert K. Weiss, who deserves kudos for the inspired idiocy of his Amazon Women segments", was the opinion of The New York Times.

In a retrospective article for Entertainment Weekly, Chris Nashawaty called this film "the beginning of the end of Landis' career". He cited the episodes featuring Monique Gabrielle, Archie Hahn, Ed Begley Jr. and David Alan Grier as "inspired", but criticized others for their failure: "You'll never see Michelle Pfeiffer look as trapped as she does in her skit with Thirtysomethings Peter Horton, or Joe Pantoliano and Arsenio Hall as unfunny as they are in their skits."

Amazon Women on the Moon has a rating of 65% on Rotten Tomatoes, based on 20 reviews, with an average rating of 5.7/10. On Metacritic it has a 42% score based on reviews from 11 critics.

See also

 The Kentucky Fried Movie (1977), a similarly formatted anthology comedy from John Landis
 Disco Beaver from Outer Space (1978)
 UHF (1989)

References

External links
 
 
 

1987 films
1980s science fiction comedy films
1980s parody films
1980s satirical films
American science fiction comedy films
American parody films
American satirical films
American anthology films
1980s English-language films
Films directed by Joe Dante
Films directed by John Landis
Films directed by Carl Gottlieb
Films directed by Robert K. Weiss
Films produced by John Landis
Films produced by George Folsey Jr.
Films scored by Ira Newborn
Universal Pictures films
Retrofuturism
Moon in film
1987 comedy films
Sketch comedy films
Films produced by Robert K. Weiss
1980s American films